The Crab Silvers (カニカニ銀 kani kani gin) is a shogi opening. It is a type of Rapid Attack Fortress opening, used mostly when playing Black (sente). It is often classified as a trap opening. It was created by professional shogi player Kōichi Kodama, for which he received the prestigious Kōzō Masuda Award in 2003.

Overview
Due to the large amount of freedom of the rook to enter into the game, finding ways to attack even in the middle of a Rapid Attack Fortress has quite the merit.

Unlike the Double-Silver Rapid Attack Fortress, king and gold don't move at all from their initial position (Sitting king). In the fifth movement, rather than pushing P-66, the silver is pushed to S-77. Instead of opting not to push the rook pawn from Fortress, White (gote) will play S-33 following Black's rook pawn being pushed to P-25, which will be followed by ▲S-48, ▲P-56, ▲S-57, ▲S-46. After that, if White (gote) were to push the pawn in the 5th file, the rook will go to the center file with ▲R-58, and then, for example, ▲B-97, ▲S-66, ▲N-77, with the aim of breaking through the center. 

Although at first it was frequent for White (gote) to unthinkingly push the gold to △G-32, since it was difficult for Black (sente) to defend from a breakthrough from the center, making preparations beforehand by playing △G61-52 became more frequent. When aiming to attack from the center, pushing the pawn in the 3rd file with ▲P-36 allows the rival to attack the king on its weak points and also delays the attack, so it is often considered a bad move.

See also

 Fortress opening
 Morishita System
 Akutsu Rapid Attack Fortress
 Waki System
 Spearing the Sparrow
 Fortress vs Right Fourth File Rook
 Static Rook
 Central Rook

References

Bibliography

児玉孝一『必殺！カニカニ銀: ―究極の二枚銀戦法』（1992年、日本将棋連盟、） (Koichi Kodama's 'Hissatsu! Kani kani gin' or "Knockout! Crab Silvers: The Ultimate Two-Silvers Opening").
 青野照市『プロの新手28』（1989年、日本将棋連盟）
 神谷広志『奇襲虎の巻』（2003年[文庫化時のもの、当初の発行年は1994年]、毎日コミュニケーションズ）130-145頁
 塚田泰明監修・横田稔著『序盤戦！！囲いと攻めの形』（1998年、高橋書店）

External links
 http://yamajunnshoginews.blogspot.com/search/label/Kani-kani%20Gin%20senpou
 http://www.shogi-rule.com/category8/kanikanigin.html
 http://chesirecat0512.blog117.fc2.com/blog-entry-492.html
 https://www.youtube.com/watch?v=qwfZ57vZdiE

Shogi openings
Fortress openings
Static Rook openings